Shumaira "Shim" Mheuka (born 20 October 2007) is an English footballer who plays as a forward for  club Chelsea.

Club career
Born in England to Zimbabwean parents, Mheuka joined Brighton & Hove Albion at the age of nine. He progressed well through Brighton & Hove Albion's academy, making his debut at under-18 level while only fourteen years old.

In July 2022, Mheuka signed with fellow Premier League club Chelsea. He made his debut for Chelsea's under-18 team in a 2–1 win over West Bromwich Albion in October 2022.

International career
Mheuka has represented England at under-15 and under-16 level. He remains eligible to represent Zimbabwe at international level.

Personal life

Family
His father, Malcom, was born in Dangamvura, Mutare, Zimbabwe, and played as an attacking midfielder for the Zimbabwe Saints and Circle Cement in the Zimbabwe Premier Soccer League. His younger brother, Tendah, plays for the academy of Brighton & Hove Albion.

Sponsorship
Mheuka is sponsored by German sportswear manufacturer Adidas.

References

2007 births
Living people
English people of Zimbabwean descent
English footballers
England youth international footballers
Association football forwards
Brighton & Hove Albion F.C. players
Chelsea F.C. players
Black British sportspeople